Nord's nineteenth constituency is a French legislative constituency in the Nord département (in the far North of France). It is one of twenty-one in that département, and covers three cantons in whole or in part : Bouchain, Denain and Valenciennes-Sud (minus Valenciennes itself).

Deputies
This was a consistently left-wing constituency until 2017. It was long held by the French Communist Party prior to the 2002 election.

Election results

2022

2017

2012

 
 
 
 
 
|-
| colspan="8" bgcolor="#E9E9E9"|
|-
 
 

 
 
 
 

* Withdrew before the 2nd round

2007
The constituency was one of just two (the other being Seine-Saint-Denis' 7th constituency) in which there was only one candidate in the second round, thus guaranteeing his re-election. The law provides that candidates obtaining the votes of at least 12.5% of registered voters in the first round advance to the second round. The parties of the mainstream left had a nationwide agreement whereby if two of them advanced to the second round, the second-placed would automatically withdraw. Primarily, this was to avoid dividing the left-wing or centre-left electorate in constituencies where a right-wing, centre-right or far-right candidate had also reached the second round. In the North's 19th constituency, however, as in 2002, the Socialist and Communist candidates were the only ones to reach the second round, respectively in first and second place. Communist candidate and former MP Patrick Leroy again honoured the agreement and withdrew, enabling Patrick Roy to be re-elected in a walkover. 24.4% of voters nonetheless cast a blank ballot.

2007

 
 
 
 
 
 
|-
| colspan="8" bgcolor="#E9E9E9"|
|-
 
 

 
 
 
 

* Withdrew before the 2nd round

2002
The constituency was one of just three (the others being Paris' 16th constituency and Nord's 16th constituency) in which there was only one candidate in the second round, thus guaranteeing his re-election. The law provides that candidates obtaining the votes of at least 12.5% of registered voters in the first round advance to the second round. The parties of the mainstream left had a nationwide agreement whereby if two of them advanced to the second round, the second-placed would automatically withdraw. Primarily, this was to avoid dividing the left-wing or centre-left electorate in constituencies where a right-wing, centre-right or far-right candidate had also reached the second round. In the North's 19th constituency, however, incumbent Communist MP Patrick Leroy and his Socialist challenger Patrick Roy were the only ones to reach the second round, respectively in second and first and place; Roy pipped Leroy to first place by fewer than 200 votes (0.43%). Leroy honoured the agreement and withdrew, enabling Roy and the Socialists to take the constituency in a walkover.

 
 
 
 
 
 
|-
| colspan="8" bgcolor="#E9E9E9"|
|-

1997

 
 
 
 
 
 
|-
| colspan="8" bgcolor="#E9E9E9"|
|-
 
 

 
 
 
 

* Withdrew before the 2nd round

References

19